Catch My Soul is a 1974 film produced by Jack Good and Richard M. Rosenbloom, and directed by Patrick McGoohan. It was an adaptation of Good's stage musical of the same title, which itself was loosely adapted from William Shakespeare's Othello. It was not a critical success.

Plot

Cast

Production 
Shakespeare's tragedy of revenge and racism had been retitled Catch My Soul for the London stage and relocated from Venice to Piccadilly; for the film, the location of the drama was moved to the New Mexico desert; filming took place in Española and Santa Fe. The title comes from act 3, scene 3 of Shakespeare's play, in which Othello declares his love for Desdemona, "Perdition catch my soul / But I do love thee! And when I love thee not, / Chaos is come again."

Although much of the plot remains intact, Othello, the "noble Moor" becomes the pacifist leader of a hippie commune, Iago appears to be the Devil incarnate who "fits all the negative stereotypes of dropouts with his scruffy beard and unwashed look" and Desdemona becomes a "white round-faced girl with granny glasses".

Patrick McGoohan had earlier starred in the successful 1962 modernisation of the Othello story, All Night Long, which had been moved to 1960s London and fuelled by jazz music. AllMovie's reviewer points out that "perhaps he thought lightning would strike twice in moving it to a gospel show in the Southwest. He was terribly wrong." Catch My Soul would be the only film to be directed by McGoohan, although he later directed some episodes of Columbo. In an interview with Première magazine in 1995, McGoohan gave some insight into why the film had failed:

Of the cast, Richie Havens was well known from his appearance at Woodstock Festival, but this was his first acting role; Lance LeGault had some experience, but not playing major roles; likewise Season Hubley and Susan Tyrrell. Tony Joe White was already fairly well known as a musician. Allmovie's Craig Butler was moved to comment "Laughable also describes every dramatic performance, as do horrible and unbelievable."

Reception
The film appeared at the same time as Jesus Christ Superstar. It failed as an arthouse film, was retitled Santa Fe Satan, and reissued as a drive-in exploitation film.

Critical reviews of Catch My Soul were generally negative, Time Out'''s reviewer describing it as

Leslie Halliwell was equally scathing, his description being

AllMovie's Craig Butler was able to say that "some of the musical performances, especially from Richie Havens and Tony Joe White are quite good, and much of the music is worth hearing ... removed from the movie." Nevertheless, his overall assessment is "a train wreck of a movie that inspires awe and that makes one appreciate a time when awful movies could be so bad in such an interesting way."

 Soundtrack 
A soundtrack album was issued by Metromedia to tie-in with the film. Vincent Canby for The New York Times'', in line with others, commented "Forget the movie and get the soundtrack album."
Track listing
 "Othello, Pt. 1" – Tony Joe White. Sung by Tony Joe White
 "Wash Us Clean" – Jack Good, Tony Joe White. Sung by Tony Joe White
 "Catch My Soul, Pt. 1" – Jack Good, Tony Joe White. Sung by Lance LeGault
 "Working on a Building" – Tony Joe White. Sung by Richie Havens
 "Othello, Pt. 2" – Tony Joe White. Sung by Tony Joe White
 "Catch My Soul, Pt. 2" – Jack Good, Tony Joe White. Sung by Lance LeGault
 "Open Our Eyes" – Leon Lumkins. Sung by Richie Havens
 "Backwoods Preacher Man" – Tony Joe White. Sung by Tony Joe White
 "Looking Back" – Delaney Bramlett, Tony Joe White. Sung by Tony Joe White
 "Eat the Bread-Drink the Wine" – Jack Good, Tony Joe White. Sung by Lance LeGault
 "That's What God Said" – Delaney Bramlett. Sung by Lance LeGault. Sung by Delaney Bramlett
 "Chug-A-Lug (The Drinking Song)" – Delaney Bramlett. Sung by Bonnie Bramlett
 "I Found Jesus" – Delaney Bramlett. Sung by Delaney Bramlett
 "Run, Shaker Life" – (unknown). Sung by Richie Havens
 "Catch My Soul, Pt. 3" – Jack Good, Tony Joe White. Sung by Lance LeGault
 "Book of Prophecy" – Jack Good, Richie Havens. Sung by Richie Havens
 "Othello, Pt. 3" – Tony Joe White. Sung by Tony Joe White
 "Lust of the Blood" – Jack Good, Ray Pohlman. Sung by Lance LeGault
 "Tickle His Fancy" – Allene Lubin. Sung by Susan Tyrrell
 "Why" – Jack Good, Emile Dean Zoghby. Sung by Richie Havens
 "Othello, Pt. 4" – Tony Joe White. Sung by Tony Joe White
 "Catch My Soul, Pt. 4" – Jack Good, Tony Joe White. Sung by Lance LeGault
 "Put Out the Light" – Jack Good, Ray Pohlman. Sung by Richie Havens
 "Othello, Pt. 5" – Tony Joe White. Sung by Tony Joe White.

References

External links

1974 films
Films based on Othello
Films set in New Mexico
1970s musical films
Films directed by Patrick McGoohan
Films based on adaptations
Cinerama Releasing Corporation films
American musical films
1970s English-language films
1970s American films